Nina Sandrine Jazy (born 25 November 2005) is a German competitive swimmer. She won the gold medal in the 50-metre freestyle and a bronze medal in the 4×100-metre freestyle relay at the 2022 European Junior Swimming Championships.

Background
Jazy was born 25 November 2005 in Recklinghausen, Germany, and competes as part of the SG Essen swim club. She formerly competed for SG Dortmund.

Career

2021–2022
At the 2021 European Junior Swimming Championships, held in July in Rome, Italy, Jazy competed in four events, placing eighth in the 50-metre freestyle, 24th in the 100-metre freestyle, sixth in the 4×100-metre freestyle relay, and sixth in the 4×100-metre mixed freestyle relay. In September, she won three medals at the 2021 German Short Course National Championships in Wuppertal when she was 15 years old, including a silver medal in the 50-metre freestyle with a personal best time of 24.84 seconds. In April the following year, she was named to Team Germany for the 2022 European Junior Swimming Championships, held in July in Otopeni, Romania. Two months later, she won the gold medal and national title in the 50-metre freestyle with a personal best time of 25.23 seconds at the German Championships. Two days earlier, she achieved a personal best time of 55.62 seconds for the 100-metre freestyle, swimming the time on the lead-off leg of the 4×100-metre freestyle relay.

2022 European Junior Championships

As a 16-year-old at the 2022 European Junior Swimming Championships, Jazy won her first medal on the first day of competition, anchoring the 4×100-metre freestyle relay to a bronze medal-win in 3:45.63 with a split time of 54.65 seconds. The second medal she won was a gold medal in the 50-metre freestyle, where she finished first with a personal best time of 25.22 seconds. Her time was less than two-tenths of a second faster than silver medalist Bianca Costea of Romania and bronze medalist Sara Curtis of Italy. In her other events she placed sixth in the 4×200-metre freestyle relay, leading off the finals relay with a 2:08.20, and placed thirteenth in the 100-metre freestyle with a time of 56.76 seconds.

In the autumn following the Championships, Jazy competed at the 2022 FINA Swimming World Cup in October in Berlin, placing seventeenth in the 100-metre freestyle with a personal best time of 54.44 seconds, which was 0.97 seconds faster than her former personal best time of 55.41 seconds. The following month, and before her seventeenth birthday on the twenty-fifth, she set a German junior record in the 50-metre freestyle at the 2022 German Short Course Championships, winning the silver medal with her time of 24.53 seconds. She also lowered her personal best time in the 100-metre freestyle by 0.60 seconds with a time of 53.84 seconds for the silver medal.

2023
In early February 2023, at the German Team Championships conducted in short course metres in Essen, 17-year-old Jazy lowered her German junior record in the 50-metre freestyle with a personal best time of 24.50 seconds.

International championships (50 m)

Personal best times

Long course metres (50 m pool)

Legend: r – relay 1st leg

Short course metres (25 m pool)

References

External links
 

2005 births
Living people
People from Recklinghausen
Sportspeople from Münster (region)
German female swimmers
German female freestyle swimmers
21st-century German women